Abbotts Creek Township is one of fifteen townships in Forsyth County, North Carolina, United States. The township had a population of 11,310 according to the 2010 census.

Geographically, Abbotts Creek Township occupies  in southeastern Forsyth County.  Abbotts Creek Township contains portions of the town of Kernersville and the city of High Point, as well as the unincorporated community of Union Cross.

References

Townships in Forsyth County, North Carolina